The East Side Gallery memorial in Berlin-Friedrichshain is a permanent open-air gallery on the longest surviving section of the Berlin Wall in Mühlenstraße between the Berlin Ostbahnhof and the Oberbaumbrücke along the Spree.

In the spring of 1990, after the opening of the Berlin Wall, this section was painted by 118 artists from 21 countries. The artists commented on the political changes of 1989/90 in a good hundred paintings on the side of the Wall that was formerly facing East Berlin. Due to urban development measures, it is no longer completely preserved, and instead of the originals from then, only the replicas from 2009 exist today.

The actual border at this point was the Kreuzberg bank of the Spree. The gallery is located on the so-called hinterland wall, which closed off the border area to East Berlin. Mühlenstrasse, one of the main arterial roads to the south, ran along these border installations. Due to the spatial conditions, the previously usual concrete pipes were already installed here, so that the interior wall in this area was atypically optically, but somewhat elevated, resembling the outer wall.

According to the Künstlerinitiative East Side Gallery e.V., an association of the artists involved in the project, "The East Side Gallery is understood as a monument to the fall of the Berlin Wall and the peaceful negotiation of borders and conventions between societies and people", and has more than three million visitors per year.

Description
The Gallery consists of 105 paintings by artists from all over the world, painted in 1990 on the east side of the Berlin Wall. The actual border at this point had been the river Spree. The gallery is located on the so-called "hinterland mauer", which closed the border to West Berlin.

It is possibly the largest and longest-lasting open air gallery in the world. Paintings from Jürgen Grosse alias INDIANO, Dimitri Vrubel, Siegfrid Santoni, Bodo Sperling, Kasra Alavi, Kani Alavi, Jim Avignon, Thierry Noir, Ingeborg Blumenthal, Ignasi Blanch i Gisbert, Kim Prisu,   
Hervé Morlay VR and others have followed.

The paintings at the East Side Gallery document a time of change and express the euphoria and great hopes for a better, more free future for all people of the world.

The East Side Gallery was founded following the successful merger of the two German artists' associations VBK and BBK. The founding members were the speche of the Federal Association of Artists BBK Bodo Sperling, Barbara Greul Aschanta, Jörg Kubitzki and David Monti.

In July 2006, to facilitate access to the River Spree from the Mercedes-Benz Arena, a  section was moved somewhat west, parallel to the original position.

A 23-meter section was scheduled to be removed on 1 March 2013 to make way for luxury apartments. None of the artists whose work will be destroyed were informed of these plans. The demolition work actually started on 1 March 2013. According to German news FOCUS, authorities were not aware of the start of the demolition. Due to the involvement of protesters, demolition was postponed until at least 18 March 2013.

Remediation
Two-thirds of the paintings are badly damaged by erosion, graffiti, and vandalism. One-third have been restored by a non-profit organization which started work in 2000. The objective of this organization is the eventual restoration and preservation of all the paintings. Full restoration, particularly of the central sections, was projected for 2008. Remediation began in May 2009.

The restoration process has been marked by major conflict. Eight of the artists of 1990 refused to paint their own images again after they were completely destroyed by the renovation. In order to defend the copyright, they founded "Founder Initiative East Side" with other artists whose images were copied without permission.
Bodo Sperling launched a test case in the Berlin State Court in May 2011, represented by the Munich art lawyer Hannes Hartung and with the support of the German VG Bild-Kunst. The Court will address the question of whether art should be listed as destroyed and then re-copied without the respective artists' permission. The outcome of the trial will be a landmark declaration for European art law.

Future of the East Side Gallery 
As of 1 November 2018, the State of Berlin will be responsible for the "Park an der Spree" and "East Side Park" plots with the elements of the former Berlin Wall known as the "East Side Gallery" from the property of the State of Berlin in the Transfer of ownership to the Berlin Wall Foundation. Parliament approved a proposal from the Senator for Culture and Europe that had passed the main committee. The Berlin Wall Foundation received the mandate for the structural maintenance of the East Side Gallery monument, the maintenance of the associated public green space and the mediation of the historical site of remembrance.

In the future, visitors to the East Side Gallery should receive more information and historical classification. For this purpose, the foundation has launched an extensive management program. The aim of all new mediation offers is to illustrate the unique dual character of the historical place: On the one hand, as an artistic testimony and symbol of joy over the peaceful overcoming of the German division; as a testimony to the GDR border regime on the other hand. Both narratives need to be related in a common narrative.

Artists

 Oskar: (Hans Bierbrauer)
 Narenda K. Jain: Die sieben Stufen der Erleuchtung
 Fulvio Pinna: Hymne an das Glück
 Kikue Miyatake: Paradise Out Of The Darkness
 Günther Schaefer: Vaterland
 Georg Lutz Rauschebart
 César Olhagaray: untitled
 Jens-Helge Dahmen: Pneumohumanoiden
 Gábor Simon: Space Magic
 Siegrid Müller-Holtz: Gemischte Gefühle
 Ursula Wünsch: Frieden für Alles
 Oliver Feind, Ulrike Zott: untitled
 Ana Leonor Rodriges
 Muriel Raoux, Kani Alavi: untitled
 Muriel Raoux: Les Yeux Ouverts
 Ditmar Reiter: untitled
 Santoni: Trilogie-Maschine Macht
 Bodo Sperling: The Trans-formation of the penta gram to a peace star in a big Europe without walls
 Barbara Greul Aschanta: Deutschland im November
 Willi Berger: Soli Deo Gloria
 André Sécrit, Karsten Thomas: Du hast gelernt, was Freiheit ist
 Theodor Chezlav Tezhik: The Big Kremlin's Wind
 Catrin Resch: Europas Frühling
 Irina Dubrowskaja: Die Wand muss weichen wenn der Meteorit der Liebe kommt
 Dmitri Wrubel: Mein Gott hilf mir, diese tödliche Liebe zu überleben
 Marc Engel: Marionetten eines abgesetzten Stücks
 Alexey Taranin: untitled
 Michail Serebrjakow: Diagonale Lösung des Problems
 Rosemarie Schinzler: untitled
 Rosemarie Schinzler: Wachsen lassen
 Christine Fuchs: How's God? She's Black
 Gerhard Lahr: Berlyn
 Karin Porath: Freiheit fängt innen an
 Lutz Pottien-Seiring: untitled
 Wjatschleslaw Schjachow: Die Masken
 Dmitri Vrubel: Danke, Andrej Sacharow
 Jeanett Kipka: untitled
 Gamil Gimajew: untitled
 Jürgen Große: Die Geburt der Kachinas
 Christopher Frank: Stay Free
 Andreas Paulun: Amour, Paix
 Kim Prisu (Joaquim A. Goncalves Borregana): 1990 O povo unido nuca sera vencido 2009 Métamorphose des existences
 Greta Csatlòs (Künstlergruppe Ciccolina): Sonic Malade
 Henry Schmidt: Vergesst mir die Liebe nicht
 Thomas Klingenstein: Umleitung in den japanischen Sektor
 Karsten Wenzel: Die Beständigkeit der Ignoranz
 Pierre-Paul Maillé: untitled
 Andy Weiß: Geist Reise
 Gabriel Heimler: Der Mauerspringer
 Salvadore de Fazio: Dawn of Peace
 Gerald Kriedner: Götterdämmerung
 Christos Koutsouras: Einfahrt Tag und Nacht freihalten
 Yvonne Onischke (geb. Matzat; Künstlername seit 2005 Yoni): Berlin bei Nacht
 Peter Peinzger: untitled
 Elisa Budzinski: Wer will, daß die Welt so bleibt, wie sie ist, der will nicht, daß sie bleibt
 Sabine Kunz: untitled
 Jay One (Jacky Ramier): untitled
 Klaus Niethardt: Justitia
 Mirta Domacinovic: Zeichen in der Reihe
 Patrizio Porrachia: untitled
 Ines Bayer, Raik Hönemann: Es gilt viele Mauern abzubauen
 Thierry Noir: untitled
 Teresa Casanueva: untitled
 Stephan Cacciatore: La Buerlinca
 Karina Bjerregaard, Lotte Haubart: Himlen over Berlin
 Christine Kühn: Touch the Wall
 Rodolfo Ricàlo: Vorsicht
 Birgit Kinder: Test the Rest
 Margaret Hunter, Peter Russell: untitled
 Peter Russell: Himmel und Sucher
 Margaret Hunter: Joint Venture
 Sándor Rácmolnár: Waiting for a New Prometheus
 Gábor Imre: untitled
 Pal Gerber: Sag, welche wunderbaren Träumen halten meinen Sinn umfangen
 Gábor Gerhes: untitled
 Sándor Györffy: untitled
 Gruppe Stellvertretende Durstende
 Laszlo Erkel (Kentaur): You can see Infinity
 Kani Alavi: Es geschah im November
 Jim Avignon: Miriam Butterfly, Tomas Fey: Doin it cool for the East Side
 Peter Lorenz: untitled
 Dieter Wien: Der Morgen
 Jacob Köhler: Lotus
 Carmen Leidner: Niemandsland
 Jens Hübner, Andreas Kämper: untitled
 Hans-Peter Dürhager, Ralf Jesse: Der müde Tod
 Jolly Kunjappu: Dancing to Freedom
 Susanne Kunjappu-Jellinek: Curriculum Vitae
 Mary Mackey: Tolerance
 Carsten Jost, Ulrike Steglich: Politik ist die Fortsetzung des Krieges mit anderen Mitteln
 Brigida Böttcher: Flora geht
 Ignasi Blanch i Gisbert: Parlo d'Amor
 Kiddy Cidny: Ger-Mania
 Petra Suntinger, Roland Gützlaff: untitled
 Andrej Smolak: untitled
 Youngram Kim-Holdfeld: untitled
 Karin Velmanns: untitled
 Rainer Jehle: Denk-Mal, Mahn-Mal
 Kamel Alavi: untitled
 Kasra Alavi: Flucht
 Ingeborg Blumenthal: Der Geist ist wie Spuren der Vögel am Himmel
 Youngram Kim

Awards 

 2010: 1st special prize “Lived Unity” “365 Landmarks in the Land of Ideas” under the patronage of Federal President Horst Köhler, sponsored by the Federal Government.

In popular media
 The gallery was seen in Wolfgang Becker's movie Goodbye, Lenin!
 The gallery was featured in the fifth leg of The Amazing Race 6 and the sixth leg of The Amazing Race 32.
 The gallery was featured in English indie/rock band Bloc Party'''s single Kreuzberg taken from the album A Weekend in the City Panel 32, Gerhard Lahr's "Berlyn", is seen in Anton Corbijn's video for U2's song One.

East Side Gallery photos

References

Literature
 Mauerkatalog „East Side Gallery“. Oberbaum-Verlag, Berlin 1991, 

External links

 Artist Initiative East Side Gallery e.V. (official website)
 April 2015 Cloudy and no tourists
 Virtual e-Tour East Side Gallery 2007
 Berlin Street Video along the East Side Gallery
A visit to the East Side Gallery on MuseumChick
The East Side Gallery on OpenStreetMap
 Picture of the East side Gallery
 Tolerance: Mary Mackey and the East Side Gallery (''Trailer)
 East Side Gallery at Google Cultural Institute

1990 establishments in Germany
Art museums and galleries in Berlin
Art museums established in 1990
Berlin Wall
Buildings and structures in Friedrichshain-Kreuzberg
Public art in Germany